Peck is a surname which can have two meanings. Either "one who dwells near the foot of a peak" or "one who deals in weights and measures". The name is thought to, but not proven to, originate in the Nottinghamshire/East Midlands England, or Denbighshire in Wales.

List of people surnamed Peck
Annie Smith Peck (1850–1935), American mountaineer
Archibald Peck (born 1983), Canadian professional wrestler
Archie A. Peck (1894–1978), American Medal of Honor recipient
Austin Peck (born 1971), American actor
Bethuel Peck (1788–1862), New York physician and politician
Bob Peck (1945–1999), English actor
Bob Peck (American football) (1891–1932), American football player
Carolyn Peck (born 1966), American women's basketball coach
Charles Horton Peck, (1833–1917), American mycologist
Cyrus Wesley Peck (1871–1956), Canadian recipient of the Victoria Cross
Dale Peck (born 1967), American novelist
Danielle Peck (born 1978), country-rock singer
Edmund Peck (1850–1924), Anglican missionary in Canada
Sir Edward Peck (British Civil Servant) (1915–2009), British ambassador, climber and author
Edward Peck (born 1929), United States retired diplomat
Elisha Peck  (1789–1851), American businessman
Everett Peck (1950–2022), American cartoonist and animator
Evie Peck, American actress
Ethan Peck (born 1986), American actor
Fay Peck (1931 – 2016) was an American Expressionist artist.
Francis Peck (1692–1743), British antiquarian
Gayle Peck, better known as Julie London (1926–2000), American singer
Ged Peck (born 1947), British guitarist
George Peck (disambiguation), several people
Gordon H. Peck (1857–1921), New York assemblyman
Gregory Peck (1916–2003), American actor
Harrison J. Peck (1842-1913), American politician and newspaper editor
Harry Thurston Peck (1856–1914), American classical scholar
Ian Peck (born 1957), English cricketer
J. Eddie Peck (John Edward Peck, born 1958), American actor
James Peck (disambiguation), several people
Jedediah Peck (1748–1821), American educationalist
Jesse Truesdell Peck (1811–1883), bishop of the Methodist Episcopal Church
Jim Peck (born 1943), American game show host
John Peck (disambiguation), several people
Josh Peck (born 1986), American actor
Judith Peck, American artist
Justin Peck (born 1987), New York City Ballet dancer
M. Scott Peck (Morgan Scott Peck, 1936–2005), American psychiatrist and author
Mary Peck, birth name of Mary Butterworth (1686–1775), American counterfeiter
Mary Gray Peck (1867–1957), American journalist, suffragist, clubwoman
Maryly Van Leer Peck, university president and founder 
Matt Peck (born 1980), Canadian field hockey goalkeeper
Myettia Peck (born 1998), American Biopharmaceutical Process Engineer
Nat Peck (1925–2015), American jazz trombonist
Ralph Brazelton Peck (1912–2008), American Civil Engineer and soil mechanics expert
Richard Peck (disambiguation), several people
Robert Peck (disambiguation), several people
Roxy Peck, American statistics educator
Terry Peck (1938–2006), a Falkland Islander who aided British forces in the Falklands War
Theodore S. Peck (1843–1918), Civil War veteran
Tiler Peck (born 1989), New York City Ballet principal dancer
Tom Peck (born 1953), American racing driver
William Peck (disambiguation), several people

Fictional characters
Mr. Peck, a character in the American sitcom It's Garry Shandling's Show
Walter Peck, a character in the 1984 American supernatural comedy movie Ghostbusters

See also
G. W. Peck, mathematical group pseudonym
Pieck (surname)

English-language surnames